Peter Fitzgibbon is an Irish international rugby union referee. He has been on the IRB Elite panel (the highest level in the world) since 2009. He works full-time for the Irish Rugby Football Union as referee development officer in the Leisure Rugby department, which deals with casual play and the IRFU's tag rugby events. He is a member of the Munster Association of Referees. and also played rugby for Thomond RFC.

References

External links

Pro12 Profile

1975 births
Living people
Irish rugby union referees
Irish rugby union players
Rugby union players from County Limerick
Thomond RFC players
IRFU referees
European Rugby Champions Cup referees
EPCR Challenge Cup referees
United Rugby Championship referees
1872 Cup referees